St George's Park Cricket Ground is a sports ground in St George's Park, Port Elizabeth, South Africa. It is the home of the Port Elizabeth Cricket Club, one of the oldest cricket clubs in South Africa, and the Eastern Province cricket team. The first Test match played in South Africa took place on the ground in 1889 and it also hosted the first rugby union international played by South Africa in 1891. The first One Day International (ODI) on the ground was played in 1992 following South Africa's readmission to international cricket after the sporting boycott of South Africa during the apartheid era, and the first Twenty20 International (T20I) on the ground was played in 2007. The only women's international match to be played on the ground was a Test match in 1960.

In cricket, a five-wicket haul (also known as a "five-for" or "fifer") refers to a bowler taking five or more wickets in a single innings. This is regarded as a notable achievement. This article details the five-wicket hauls taken on the ground in official international Test matches and One Day Internationals.

The first Test match at St George's Park took place in 1889. A South African representative side played against a touring side of English players organised by Major RG Warton. In 1897 the match was retrospectively awarded Test match status, making this South Africa's first Test match and, because South Africa did not have any first-class cricket teams at the time, the inaugural first-class match played in South Africa. The first five-wicket hauls in Test matches on the ground were taken during this Test, the first by  England's Aubrey Smith who took five wickets for the cost of 19 runs in the only Test match of his career. South Africa's Albert Rose-Innes took his own five-wicket haul later in the same match. The best Test match innings bowling figures on the ground were the 8/7 taken by England's George Lohmann in South Africa's second innings of a match in 1896. Lohmann had already taken 7/38 in South Africa's first innings of the game, and his match figures of 15 wickets for 45 runs are also the best on the ground.

The first five-wicket haul in a One Day International on the ground was taken by Rudie van Vuuren of Namibia against England at the 2003 Cricket World Cup. The best ODI bowling figures on the ground were taken by Andy Bichel of Australia, who took 7/20, also against England during the same competition.  no five-wicket hauls have been taken in T20I matches on the ground.

Key

Test match five-wicket hauls

There have been 36 five-wicket hauls taken in Test matches on the ground.

One Day International five-wicket hauls

Six five-wicket hauls have been taken in ODIs on the ground.

Notes

References

External links
International five-wicket hauls at St George's Park, CricInfo

St George's Park